The Ventspils I–Tukums II Railway is a -long, -gauge railway built in the 20th century to connect the Latvian towns of Ventspils and Tukums.

References 

Railway lines in Latvia
Railway lines opened in 1901
1900s establishments in Latvia
5 ft gauge railways in Latvia